Kismayo Airport , also known as Kisimayu Airport, is an international airport serving Kismayo, the capital city of the Lower Juba region in Somalia. It is located in southern Jubaland, an autonomous region in Somalia.

The airport was first seen under construction in 1973 by the Central Intelligence Agency. It was meant to replace the natural surface old Kismayo Airfield that had been constructed during the Italian protectorate in the 1930s.

In August 2013, the Kismayo Airport was officially brought under the Juba Interim Administration. Per agreement, management of the facility was scheduled to be transferred to the Federal Government of Somalia after a period of six months. Revenues and resources generated from the airport will also be earmarked for Jubaland's service delivery and security sectors as well as local institutional development.

Facilities

Military presence
The airport is home to Camp Kismayo, a military base hosting Somali Army and African Union forces, and it is also home to a large UN compound. The airport has received flights from the 75th EAS to resupply Danab and US forces operating in the region.

Airlines and destinations

Gallery

See also
List of airports in Somalia

References

Airports in Somalia
Jubaland
Lower Juba